Jesse Solomon (born February 11, 1967) is a professional guitar player based in Northern Colorado. He currently runs the Academy of Guitar in Fort Collins, Colorado.

Solomon received a degree in professional guitar playing at the Musicians Institute in Hollywood, California.

Upon graduating from MI, Solomon moved back to Colorado and got involved with various music projects in the Front Range area. He played guitar with the bands Screamin’ O, Strapless, Windfall and Canebrake Run, as well as pairing up with his fellow guitar-playing brother Rob Solomon.

Early life 
Jesse Solomon was born on February 11, 1967, in Victorville, California. When he was 3 years old, his family moved to Spain, then England, Florida and Nevada before finally settling in Fort Collins, Colorado when Solomon was 12 years old. Inspired to play music by his three older brothers, Kevin, Richard and Rob, as well as his father, Jesse began playing guitar and drums when he was 6 years old. Solomon went on to play percussion in his school band and took a handful of guitar lessons before graduating high school and attending the Guitar Institute of Technology, a part of the Musicians Institute in Hollywood, California.

Music career

Early career 
After graduating from a one-year program at GIT with an associate degree in professional guitar playing, Solomon briefly played with California-based band “Siren,” before moving back to Fort Collins.

At 19, Solomon began playing in a duet with guitar-player and vocalist brother Rob. The duo performed cover songs in various clubs and ski locations along the Front Range. Solomon simultaneously began performing popular rock songs with the band Screamin' O as well as playing with Windfall, another cover band. At this time, he also began teaching guitar lessons.

After Screamin' O fell apart, Solomon formed the band Strapless in 1987. Though at first focused on playing popular hard rock covers, the band, at Solomon’s urging, began writing and playing original melodic hard rock songs in 1989 with then current lineup of Frank Costa on lead vocals, James Urban on bass guitar and Bruce Da Moose on drums. The band self-produced two albums, titled “Luck of the Draw” and “Peace by Piece” enjoying regional attention with the song "Lady Strange" which received airplay throughout the region and even as far as Florida . Strapless also appeared on a local cable show called “Alley Tracks.” Solomon would later appear on the show with the band Windfall, his brother Rob and John Magnie of The Subdudes.

Strapless broke up in 1992 after the widespread onset of grunge rock. Solomon continued playing with Windfall and his brother, as well as teaching guitar lessons. In 1996, Windfall performed at Northern Colorado Music Fest, where they were voted “Best Band” and Solomon was voted “Best Guitar Player.” That same year, Solomon, his brother and the bass player from Strapless formed a new rock band called Canebrake Run. Their first show was opening for The Fabulous Thunderbirds. Canebrake Run recorded one self-produced album called “Nothin’ to Hide.” Solomon also recorded an album with Randy Pfeuffer of Windfall titled “Where Do We Go From Here” as well as an album with his brother Rob. Canebrake Run disbanded in 2000, and Solomon dedicated himself full-time to the Academy of Guitar, which he founded in 1996, resulting in his being nominated for the Governor’s Excellence in the Arts awards.

Solo career 
In 2008, Solomon released his first solo album “Fire! Ready, Aim". He played guitar, bass and drums on the album, which he recorded in just one week at Pig Pen Studios, the Blasting Room and the University of Northern Colorado recording facility. Solomon played his first solo live show at a CD release party at the Academy of Guitar in February 2009. In June 2010, he performed as a guest guitarist with the band Uncle Fester opening for Blue Öyster Cult in Craig, Colorado. He continues to appear as a guest guitarist for various artists. He was invited to play with Jennifer Batten at for Musicians Institute's first all school reunion in April 2011. Other musicians performing were Paul Gilbert, Keith Wyatt, Dan Gilbert, Steve Trovato, Larry Carlton and Pat Martino. In the summer of 2013 he was the opener for Jennifer Batten on a west coast tour that went from Portland, Oregon to San Diego, California and back.

Teaching 
In 1996, Solomon formed the Academy of Guitar in Fort Collins, Colorado. At first housed in a rented space, the academy was later moved to Solomon’s house. In 2003, Solomon moved the academy to a separate location, which houses various rooms for private lessons as well as a performing area called the Showcase Room. Solomon manages the school, which has several guitar, bass and drum instructors. Academy students regularly perform at the Showcase Room and have played at the annual New West Fest in Fort Collins. Over 1,000 students have been taught at the Academy of Guitar. Among its most notable graduates are two members of Fort Collins-based band Tickle Me Pink.

Personal life 
Solomon married wife Stacy in 1994. They have raised Stacy’s two children from a previous marriage and have one daughter together.

Notes

External links
Jesse Solomon on CD Baby
Rob Solomon's website

American rock guitarists
American male guitarists
American music educators
Living people
1967 births
People from Fort Collins, Colorado
Guitarists from Colorado
People from Victorville, California
20th-century American guitarists
20th-century American male musicians